Devi Dharisanam is a 1980 Indian Tamil-language film,  directed by K. Shankar and produced by T. A. K. Chari. The film stars K. R. Vijaya, Latha, Sarath Babu and S. V. Subbaiah.

Cast

K. R. Vijaya
Latha
Manju Bhargavi in guest appearance
Sarath Babu
S. V. Subbaiah
S. A. Ashokan
Thengai Srinivasan
V. S. Raghavan
S. V. Ramadoss
V. Gopalakrishnan
Nalinikanth
Goundamani
Rajagopal
I. S. R.
Gopu
Chandran Babu
Thangaraj
T. K. S. Natarajan
Dhandapani
Balaji
Sarathkumar
Uthirapathi
Uthayanan
Narasimhan
Sukumari
Thambaram Lalitha
Baby Babitha
Baby Jaishanthi

Production
In order to make the film "a lavish affair", director K. Shankar cast K. R. Vijaya, Latha, Sripriya and Sridevi.

Reception

References

External links
 

1980 films
Hindu devotional films
1980s Tamil-language films
Films scored by M. S. Viswanathan
Films directed by K. Shankar